The Big Sound may refer to:

The Big Sound (Johnny Hodges album), 1957
The Big Sound (Gene Ammons album), 1958
Simon Dupree and the Big Sound, a 1960s Scottish band
Big Sound, a 2000–2001 Canadian television sitcom